The Eggplant emoji (🍆), also known by its Unicode name of Aubergine, is an emoji featuring a purple eggplant.  Social media users have noted the emoji's phallic appearance and often use it as a euphemistic or suggestive icon during sexting conversations, to represent a penis.

Development and usage history

The eggplant emoji was originally included in proprietary emoji sets from SoftBank Mobile and au by KDDI. When Apple released the first iPhone in 2007, there was an emoji keyboard intended for Japanese users only, which encoded them using SoftBank's Private Use Area scheme. However, after iPhone users in the United States discovered that downloading Japanese apps allowed access to the keyboard, pressure grew to expand the availability of the emoji keyboard beyond Japan.

As part of a set of characters sourced from SoftBank, au by KDDI, and NTT Docomo emoji sets, the eggplant emoji was approved as part of Unicode 6.0 in 2010 under the name "Aubergine". In 2011, Apple made the emoji keyboard a standard iOS feature worldwide. Global popularity of emojis then surged in the early to mid-2010s. 
The eggplant emoji has been included in the Unicode Technical Standard for emoji (UTS #51) since its first edition (Emoji 1.0) in 2015.

Popularity on social media and cultural impact
The "aubergine" or "eggplant" emoji is commonly used to represent a penis in sexting conversations. This usage has been noted to be common particularly in the United States, as well as in Canada. In line with the eggplant emoji's common usage in sexual contexts, Emojipedia noted that the emoji is popularly paired with the peach emoji (🍑), which is often used to represent a buttocks or female genitalia.

The emoji was used as a reference to penis on Twitter as early as 2011. By the mid-2010s, online magazine outlets wrote about how the emoji's usage in sexual contexts morphed society's connotations of the eggplant "from an innocuous vegetable to America's favorite shorthand for a throbbing cock." Slate writer Amanda Hess stated that "the eggplant has risen to become America's dominant phallic fruit." Writing for Cosmopolitan, Kathryn Lindsay stated that "this simple, previously neglected vegetable rocketed into stardom in a matter of years, thanks to our collective decision to deem it the universal symbol for dick."

In 2018, Dictionary.com became the first major reference to add explanations for emojis, although these explanations are only included on the editorial section of the website.

The eggplant emoji has been referenced by popular culture numerous times. In 2017, Netflix won a bidding war to distribute a film titled The Eggplant Emoji. The film was ultimately renamed The Package. In 2019, the cosmetics retailer Lush sold bath bombs resembling the eggplant emoji for Valentine's Day. The company expanded their eggplant and peach emoji-themed product line the following year.

Reception
As early as 2013, online media outlets have commented on the eggplant emoji's resemblance to a penis, with Complex listing it as one of "10 emojis to send while sexting."

In April 2015, Instagram released a feature allowing users to hashtag emojis. Shortly after, the platform banned the hashtag "🍆", as well as any references to "eggplant" from its search function. Later in 2019, Facebook and Instagram both banned using the eggplant or peach emojis alongside "sexual statements about being horny."

In 2016, the eggplant emoji's widespread usage as sexual innuendo led the American Dialect Society to vote it as the "Most Notable Emoji" of 2015.

References

Computer-related introductions in 2010
Eggplants
Individual emoji
Euphemisms
Symbols introduced in 2010
2010s in Internet culture
2020s in Internet culture